"Absolute E-Sensual" is a song by British singer-songwriter Jaki Graham, released on 26 June 1995 as the third and final single from her fourth album, Real Life (1994). It was a club hit, peaking at number three on the US Billboard Hot Dance Club Songs chart, with 13 weeks within the chart. Additionally, it charted in Australia and the UK, peaking at number 54 and 69, but was a bigger hit on the UK Dance Chart, reaching number 31. It also peaked at number 15 on the UK on a Pop Tip Club Chart. A music video was produced to promote the single.

Critical reception
Larry Flick from Billboard felt that Graham follows her "smashing cover" of "Ain't Nobody" with "a sultry R&B original that has been tweaked for clubland consumption by the reliably creative Teri Bristol and Mark Picchiotti. In their hands, Graham sashays inside a lush house context with the finesse that befits her seasoned career. Do not ignore the song's album version, which kicks an old-school soul vibe." Tim Jeffery from Music Weeks RM Dance Update commented, "I know what you're thinking – 'Not another attempt by Jaki to get in on the pop garage act' – and you're partly right. The house mixes are cheesy and cliched with predictable piano breaks and all the rest, but the original swinging funky version is really very good, with an old-school feel that suits Graham's voice far better than the House versions. With midtempo swing tracks regularly hitting the charts now maybe she's finally found her niche again." 

Track listing
 12", US"Absolute E-Sensual" (Jak-D-House Mix) – 6:32
"Absolute E-Sensual" (Jak And Forth Dub) – 8:28
"Absolute E-Sensual" (Old Skool Club Mix) – 5:30
"Absolute E-Sensual" (Old Skool Dub) – 4:48
"Absolute E-Sensual" (Smooth & Chunky Club Mix) – 5:31

 CD single, UK"Absolute E-Sensual" (FKB Edit) – 4:18
"Absolute E-Sensual" (Sleazesisters Gay And Happy Vibe) – 8:02
"Absolute E-Sensual" (FKB Extended Mix) – 5:35
"Absolute E-Sensual" (US Old Skool Club Mix) – 5:32
"Absolute E-Sensual" (US House Mix) – 6:33 

 CD maxi, US'
"Absolute E-Sensual" (Original Mix) – 4:21
"Absolute E-Sensual" (Old Skool Radio Mix) – 4:36
"Absolute E-Sensual" (R & B Radio Mix) – 4:36
"Absolute E-Sensual" (Jak-D-House Radio Mix) – 4:17
"Absolute E-Sensual" (Old Skool Club Mix) – 5:30
"Absolute E-Sensual" (Jak-D-House Club Mix) – 6:32

Charts

Release history

References

External links
 Jaki Graham on Discogs

1995 singles
1995 songs
Avex Group singles
British house music songs
Songs written by Andrew Klippel